Sanga Sanga could refer to:
 Sanga-Sanga, Indonesia in East Kalimantan 
 Sanga-Sanga (island), an island in the Philippines
 Sanga-Sanga Airport, and airport on Sanga Sanga island